2017 Shimizu S-Pulse season.

J1 League

References

External links
 J.League official site

Shimizu S-Pulse
Shimizu S-Pulse seasons